William Malaki Starks (born c. 2003) is an American football safety for the Georgia Bulldogs.

High school career
Starks attended Jefferson High School in Jefferson, Georgia. He was ranked by ESPN as the No. 12 recruit in college football's class of 2022.In October 2021, he committed to play college football for Georgia.

College career
As a true freshman, Starks emerged Georgia's starting free safety. In a game against Missouri, Starks made a tackle that was later cited by head coach Kirby Smart as being the key play of the game. At the end of the season, he was named to Pro Football Focus's PFF True Freshman All-America team.

References

External links
 Georgia bio

Living people
American football defensive backs
Georgia Bulldogs football players
Players of American football from Georgia (U.S. state)
Year of birth missing (living people)